Ni Putu Desi Margawati (born 19 December 1980) is an Indonesian retired pole vaulter who enjoyed success on the continental level, especially around 2001–2003.

On the continental scene she finished fourth at the 2000 Asian Championships, won the bronze medal at the 2002 Asian Championships, finished fifth at the 2002 Asian Games and won the bronze medal at the 2003 Asian Championships, then a few years later won the gold medal at the 2007 Asian Indoor Games and the bronze medal at the 2009 Asian Indoor Games.

On the regional scene she won the gold medals at the 2001 (inaugural for women's pole vault) and 2003 Southeast Asian Games, finished fourth at the 2009 Southeast Asian Games and won the bronze medal at the 2011 Southeast Asian Games.

Her personal best jump is 4.10 metres, achieved at the 2002 Asian Championships. This is the Indonesian record.

References

1980 births
Living people
Sportspeople from West Nusa Tenggara
Indonesian pole vaulters
Athletes (track and field) at the 2002 Asian Games
Asian Games competitors for Indonesia
Competitors at the 2003 Southeast Asian Games
Competitors at the 2009 Southeast Asian Games
Competitors at the 2011 Southeast Asian Games
Southeast Asian Games gold medalists for Indonesia
Southeast Asian Games bronze medalists for Indonesia
Southeast Asian Games medalists in athletics
20th-century Indonesian women
21st-century Indonesian women